Zsuzsa Almássy (born October 8, 1950 in Budapest) is a Hungarian former figure skater. She is the 1969 World bronze medalist, a three-time European medalist, and a five-time Hungarian national champion. She competed at three Winter Olympics, placing 17th in 1964, 6th in 1968, and 5th in 1972. She was coached by Arnold Gerschwiler.

Results

References

Navigation

Figure skaters at the 1964 Winter Olympics
Figure skaters at the 1968 Winter Olympics
Figure skaters at the 1972 Winter Olympics
Hungarian female single skaters
Olympic figure skaters of Hungary
1950 births
Living people
World Figure Skating Championships medalists
European Figure Skating Championships medalists
Universiade gold medalists for Hungary
Universiade medalists in figure skating
Competitors at the 1970 Winter Universiade
Figure skaters from Budapest
20th-century Hungarian women
21st-century Hungarian women